Chadi Bin Al Basheer Hammami (born 14 June 1986) is a Tunisian international footballer who plays for CS Sfaxien as a midfielder.

Club career
Born in Sfax, Hammami has played for CS Sfaxien and Al-Kuwait. On 15 May 2016, he signed a contract with Dubai Club for one season. On 27 September, he signed a contract with Dibba Al-Hisn for one season. He then played in Kuwait with Al-Fahaheel before returning to CS Sfaxien.

International career
Hammami made his international debut for Tunisia in 2007, and represented them at the Africa Cup of Nations in 2010 and 2013. He has also appeared in FIFA World Cup qualifying matches.

References

1986 births
Living people
People from Sfax
Tunisian footballers
Tunisia international footballers
CS Sfaxien players
Kuwait SC players
Dubai CSC players
Dibba Al-Hisn Sports Club players
Tunisian Ligue Professionnelle 1 players
Kuwait Premier League players
UAE First Division League players
Association football midfielders
2010 Africa Cup of Nations players
2013 Africa Cup of Nations players
Tunisian expatriate footballers
Tunisian expatriate sportspeople in Kuwait
Expatriate footballers in Kuwait
Tunisian expatriate sportspeople in the United Arab Emirates
Expatriate footballers in the United Arab Emirates
AFC Cup winning players
Al-Fahaheel FC players
Tunisia A' international footballers
2011 African Nations Championship players